The Hovhannes Shiraz House-Museum (Armenian: Հովհաննես Շիրազի տուն-թանգարան) was founded in 1983 in the Kumayri historic district of Gyumri, Armenia, and opened in 2003. The museum is devoted to the exhibition and preservation of the Armenian poet Hovhannes Shiraz's personal belongings, manuscripts and works.

The building was built in 1886, with red tuff stone of the Shirak province, and was the home of a wealthy merchant named Qeshishyan. During most of the Soviet period, it was used as a storehouse. In July 1983, not wanting to wait until Shiraz's death to honour him, government officials offered Shiraz a home to live in. However, the poet only lived in this house for a year, as he died in March 1984.

In order to preserve his legacy, the building later became a house-museum by the resolution of the Government of Armenia. Due to the 1988 Armenian earthquake, the museum's refurbishment was interrupted, and 8 homeless families found shelter in the house.  

The USAID Housing Purchase Certificate Program assisted to relocate displaced families living in the house after the earthquake to permanent housing. This permitted the museum, in collaboration with the Government of Armenia and the City Hall of Gyumri, to restore the public space as a house-museum.

Today, the western facade has a luxurious gate that leads to a large courtyard. The museum consists of six rooms. The first presents information about the poet's childhood. The second room is furnished as it was during Shiraz's lifetime. The other four rooms house the author's creative works, paintings, sculptures, etc. On display is a painting by the American author, John Steinbeck, thanking Shiraz for his hospitality in Yerevan.

The House-Museum is located on 101 Varpetats Street, Gyumri 3104, Armenia.

Gallery

References

External links 
 Museum official site

Museums in Armenia
Buildings and structures in Gyumri
Buildings and structures completed in 1886
Museums established in 2003